The following is a 'list of people from Sherbrooke, Quebec.

A
Douglas Abbott
George Oscar Alcorn
Maurice Allard
Edmund Tobin Asselin
Patrick Tobin Asselin
Josée Auclair

B
John Bassett, started his career as media baron as co-owner of the Sherbrooke RecordMatt Beaudoin
Philippe Beaudry
Éric Bélanger, NHL hockey player for the Edmonton Oilers
Claude Bertrand
Conrad Black, started his career as media baron as co-owner of the Sherbrooke Record''
Steven Blaney
Pierre-Hugues Boisvenu
Joseph-Armand Bombardier hailed from the Sherbrooke area.
François Bouchard
Pierre-Marc Bouchard, NHL hockey player for the Minnesota Wild
Benoît Boulanger
John Samuel Bourque
Kim Boutin
Robert A. Boyd
Stéphane Brochu
Edward Towle Brooks
Samuel Brooks
Alexis Bwenge

C
 Serge Cardin, former Bloc Québécois MP for Sherbrooke
Jacques Chapdelaine
 Jean Charest, federal cabinet minister, Deputy Prime Minister and Progressive Conservative Party leader; Quebec Liberal Party leader and Premier of Quebec
Dan Chicoine
Joseph-Armand Choquette
 Jim Corcoran, singer-songwriter
Marc-André Craig

D
Sylvie Daigle
Éric Dandenault
Mathieu Dandenault, former NHL ice hockey player for the Montreal Canadiens and Detroit Red Wings
Robert Davidson
Delaf
Jayson Dénommée
Sonia Denoncourt
Paul Desruisseaux
Pierre DesRuisseaux
Rita Dionne-Marsolais
 Christian Dubé, ice hockey player for SC Bern
Gilles Dubé
Norm Dubé
Pierre-Luc Dusseault, former NDP MP for Sherbrooke (2011-2019); youngest MP in Canadian history

E
William Henry Pferinger Elkins, commandant of the Royal Military College of Canada (1930-1935); commander of Atlantic Command (1940-1943)

F
Carole Facal
Reginald Fessenden
Yves Forest
 Northrop Frye, literary critic

G
 Garou, singer
André Gaudette
Antoine Gélinas-Beaulieu
 Marc Gervais, Jesuit and film professor
Paul Mullins Gervais
Sam Giguère
Maurice Gingues
Susan Goyette

H
Archibald C. Hart
Bill Heindl Jr.
I. F. Hellmuth
William Heneker, commander of the 8th Infantry Division in the First World War

J
Guy Jodoin

K
 Yousuf Karsh, photographer

L
Jean-François Labbé
Sarah Lassez
Diane Lemieux
Francis Lemieux
André Lussier

M
Olivier Magnan
Annie Martin
Allan McIver
Gord McRae
Jean-Luc Mongrain
Sean Patrick Maloney

N
Frédéric Niemeyer

O
Joseph Gilles Napoléon Ouellet
Guy Ouellette

P
Pascal-Pierre Paillé
Marc Parenteau
Donald Patriquin
 Yanic Perreault, former NHL ice hockey player
 David Perron, NHL hockey player for the Detroit Red Wings
Michael L. Phelan
Jacinthe Pineau
Gerry Plamondon
Arch Presby
David Price

R
Bobby Rivard
 Stéphane Robidas, NHL hockey player for the Dallas Stars
Alfred Rouleau
Claude Ruel

S
 Harry Saltzman, film producer
Eric Saucke-Lacelle
 Christian Savoie, winner of Canada's Strongest Man; entrant to the World's Strongest Man competition
Reed Scowen
Hollis Smith
 Ralph M. Steinman, immunologist, 2011 Nobel Prize in Medicine

T
Guy Tousignant
Maryse Turcotte
Mathieu Turcotte

V
Sarah Vaillancourt
Vincent Vallières

W
Jimmy Waite
Stéphane Waite
Norman Webster
Edson Warner

References

 
Sherbrooke
Sherbrooke